Neocepolis is a genus of air-breathing land snails, terrestrial pulmonate gastropod mollusks in the subfamily Camaeninae of the family Camaenidae.

Species
 Neocepolis merarcha (Mabille, 1888)
 Neocepolis morleti (Dautzenberg & d'Hamonville, 1887)
Species brought into synonymy
 Neocepolis cherrieri (Bavay, 1908): synonym of Neocepolis merarcha (Mabille, 1888) (unnecessary replacement name for H. langsonensis Bavay & Dautzenberg, 1899)

References

 Bank, R. A. (2017). Classification of the Recent terrestrial Gastropoda of the World. Last update: July 16th, 2017

External links
 

Camaenidae